Hypselodoris paulinae is a species of sea slug or dorid nudibranch, a marine gastropod mollusk in the family Chromodorididae.

Distribution
This nudibranch is found in the Hawaiian islands in the central Pacific Ocean.

Description
Hypselodoris paulinae has a white-cream body which is covered all over with red-brown spots and lines. The gills and rhinophores are also white, lined with red. This species can reach a total length of at least 60 mm. It has some similarity to Hypselodoris kaname.

References

Chromodorididae
Gastropods described in 1999